The Best of 1980–1990 is the first greatest hits compilation by Irish rock band U2, released on 2 November 1998. It mostly contains the group's hit singles from the 1980s, but also mixes in some live staples, as well as a re-recording of the 1987 B-side "Sweetest Thing". In April 1999, a companion video (featuring music videos and live footage) was released. The album was followed by another compilation, The Best of 1990–2000, in 2002.

A limited edition version of the album that included a second disc of B-sides was released a week earlier than the standard single-disc version. At the time of release, the official word was that the two-disc album would be available the first week the album went on sale, then pulled from stores. While this edict never materialized, it did result in the two-disc version being in very high demand. Both versions charted in the Billboard 200, with the two-disc version debuting at number two and setting a new first-week sales record in the United States for a greatest hits album by a group, with 237,500 copies sold.

The boy on the album's cover is Peter Rowen, brother of Bono's friend Guggi (real name Derek Rowen) of the Virgin Prunes. Peter also appears on the covers of U2's early EP Three, two of their first three albums (Boy and War), and Early Demos.

Commercial performance

In the United States, the double-disc version of the album (The Best of 1980-1990/The B-Sides) debuted and peaked at number two on the Billboard 200 during the week of 21 November 1998, with 237,500 copies sold. This set a new record for the best-selling opening week for a greatest hits collection by a group in the SoundScan era. The next week, it fell to number five, while the single-disc version of the album entered the chart at number 57. The single-disc version of the compilation later peaked at number four on the Billboard 200. The Best of 1980-1990/The B-Sides remained on the chart for 17 weeks, while the single-disc version was present on the chart for 44 weeks. The double-disc version was certified double platinum by the Recording Industry Association of America, denoting shipments of two million, on 4 December 1998; the standard edition was certified double platinum on 6 March 2002.

In the United Kingdom, the limited double-disc version debuted at number one on the UK Albums Chart on 14 November 1998, before dropping the following week to number two. It remained on the chart for 20 weeks. The single-disc edition entered at number eight on 21 November 1998, and two weeks later it reached its peak of number four. It charted for 126 weeks in the UK. The single-disc edition was certified quintuple platinum by the British Phonographic Industry, denoting shipments of 1.5 million units, on 8 November 2002.

In Canada, the double-disc version release had a numbered, limited edition of 175,000 units pressed. The double-disc version of the album debuted at the top of the Billboard Canadian Albums Chart for the week of 21 November 1998; this version stayed on the chart for four weeks. The next week, the standard edition debuted and peaked at number five on the chart, before falling to number eight the following week. The single-disc version remained on the chart for 15 weeks.

In Ireland, the album debuted with the highest single-week sales since 1993, when IRMA started keeping records. The album reached number one on Ireland's album chart and remained on the chart for 76 weeks.

Track listing

Disc one

Disc two (Limited Edition B-Sides)

Note: The version of "Bass Trap" found on this compilation is a shortened edit from the original 5:14 version found on "The Unforgettable Fire" 12" single EP from 1985. Same goes for the version of "A Room at the Heartbreak Hotel", which is an edit from the original version (5:29) on the "Angel of Harlem" single from 1989.

Charts

Weekly charts

Year-end charts

Certifications

Video

Music and words by U2. All tracks have been remastered for this release.

"Pride (In the Name of Love)"
"New Year's Day"
"With or Without You"
"I Still Haven't Found What I'm Looking For"
"Sunday Bloody Sunday" (from U2 Live at Red Rocks: Under a Blood Red Sky)
"Bad" (from Rattle and Hum)
"Where the Streets Have No Name"
"I Will Follow"
"The Unforgettable Fire"
"Sweetest Thing"
"Desire"
"When Love Comes to Town"
"Angel of Harlem"
"All I Want Is You"
"One Tree Hill" (Live - from a previously unreleased cut of Rattle and Hum)

Certifications 

! scope="row"| Argentina (CAPIF)
|5× Platinum
|40,000^
|-

Personnel
Bono – lead vocals, guitar, harmonica
The Edge – guitar, keyboards, vocals
Adam Clayton – bass guitar
Larry Mullen Jr. – drums, percussion

See also
U2 discography
The Best of 1990–2000
List of best-selling albums in Argentina

References

External links
The Best of 1980–1990 (standard edition) at U2 Wanderer, with comprehensive details on various editions, cover scans, lyrics, and more
The Best of 1980–1990 (limited edition) at U2 Wanderer
The Best of 1980–1990 (video) at U2 Wanderer

Album chart usages for Italy
U2 compilation albums
B-side compilation albums
1998 greatest hits albums
U2 video albums
Island Records compilation albums
Island Records video albums
Albums produced by Steve Lillywhite
Albums produced by Daniel Lanois
Albums produced by Brian Eno
Albums produced by Jimmy Iovine
Albums produced by Bono